Henry Smyth may refer to:
 Henry Smyth (Master of Magdalene College) (died 1642)
 William Henry Smyth (1788–1865), British astronomer
 Henry Smyth (British Army officer, born 1816) (1816–1891), British general
 Henry Augustus Smyth (1825–1906), Governor of Malta
 Henry Smyth (Canadian politician) (1841–1929)
 Charles Henry Smyth Jr. (1866–1937), American geologist
 Henry DeWolf Smyth (1898–1986), American physicist

See also
 Hank Smith (disambiguation)
 Harry Smyth (1910–1992), Canadian speed skater
 Harry Smythe (1904–1980), American baseball player
 Henry Smith (disambiguation)